Bagh-e Pirevali (also Romanized as Bāgh-e Pīrevalī) is a village in Rabor Rural District, in the Central District of Rabor County, Kerman Province, Iran. At the 2006 census, its population was 124, in 32 families.

References 

Populated places in Rabor County